Delbourgo is a surname. Notable people with the surname include:

 James Delbourgo (born 1972), British historian of science
 Robert Delbourgo (born 1940), Australian physicist